Richard Blade is an adult fantasy pulp novel series produced by American publisher Pinnacle Books between 1969 and 1984. The 37 books in the series were written by Roland J. Green, Ray Nelson, and Manning Lee Stokes under the pseudonym Jeffrey Lord.

The novels were also released as audio books, and as trilogy sets, each set having edited versions of three novels on six cassettes (running nine hours, or approximately three hours per novel), and later on CDs (one per book, three per trilogy set), under the name "Richard Blade Journeys". These were released as Americana Audiobooks by Americana Publishing in English.

Plot
The novels were a series of adventures featuring the titular character (MI6A's special agent Richard Blade), who was teleported into a random alternate dimension at the beginning of each novel and forced to rely on his wits and strength. Along the way, he would have several explicitly described sexual encounters with beautiful women (both in England and in the alternate dimensions), and would usually return from his adventure with some item, or bit of knowledge useful to Britain (the ostensible reason for his being sent in the first place). Richard Blade was distinctly British, and all of the stories are set in England (at least at the beginning and end, with Blade’s being teleported to some other dimension for the bulk of each tale). The series was translated into several languages, including Russian, Swedish, French, German, and Greek.

Books in the series
Sources:

 The Bronze Axe (1969) (Manning Lee Stokes)  
 The Jade Warrior (1969) (Manning Lee Stokes)  
 Jewel of Tharn (1969) (Manning Lee Stokes)  
 Slave of Sarma (1970) (Manning Lee Stokes)  
 Liberator of Jedd (1971) (Manning Lee Stokes)  
 Monster of the Maze (1973) (Manning Lee Stokes)  
 Pearl of Patmos (1973) (Manning Lee Stokes)  
 Undying World (1973) (Manning Lee Stokes)  
 Kingdom of Royth (1974) (Roland J. Green)  
 Ice Dragon (1974) (Roland J. Green)  
 Dimension of Dreams (1974) (Roland J. Green)  
 King of Zunga (1975) (Roland J. Green) 
 The Golden Steed (1975) (Roland J. Green)  
 The Temples of Ayocan (1975) (Roland J. Green)  
 The Towers of Melnon (1975) (Roland J. Green)  
 The Crystal Seas (1975) (Roland J. Green)  
 The Mountains of Brega (1976) (Roland J. Green) 
 Warlords Of Gaikon (1976) (Roland J. Green)  
 Looters of Tharn (1976) (Roland J. Green)  
 Guardians Of The Coral Throne (1976) (Roland J. Green)  
 Champion of the Gods (1976) (Roland J. Green)  
 The Forests of Gleor (1976) (Roland J. Green)  
 Empire of Blood (1977) (Roland J. Green)  
 The Dragons of Englor (1977) (Roland J. Green)  
 The Torian Pearls (1977) (Roland J. Green)  
 City of the Living Dead (1978) (Roland J. Green)  
 Master of the Hashomi (1978) (Roland J. Green)  
 Wizard of Rentoro (1978) (Roland J. Green)  
 Treasure of the Stars (1978) (Roland J. Green)  
 Dimension of Horror (1979) (Ray Faraday Nelson)  
 Gladiators of Hapanu (1979) (Roland J. Green)  
 Pirates Of Gohar (1979) (Roland J. Green)  
 Killer Plants Of Binnark (1980) (Roland J. Green)  
 The Ruins of Kaldac (1981) (Roland J. Green)  
 The Lords of the Crimson River (1981) (Roland J. Green)  
 Return to Kaldak (1983) (Roland J. Green)  
 Warriors of Latan (1984) (Roland J. Green)

Russian editions
In the early 1990s the Russian publishers could secure the rights to only the first six books in the series, and approached the translator, Mikhail Akhmanov, to write the further adventures of Richard Blade. Together with then young sci-fi author Nick Perumov and others, Akhmanov wrote over sixteen sequels to the adventures of Richard Blade, and then, after writing Russian sequels to the saga of Conan, went on to create numerous original characters and plots. Like the Conan sequels, the Russian Richard Blade sequels are not available in English. Today Akhmanov is the author of over fifty fantasy and science fiction novels.

Blade was released in France in 1974, presented by Gérard de Villiers. The first thirty-seven volumes were France-Marie Watkins translations of the original novels. After that [Richard D. Nolane] wrote a total of 43 novels, anonymously then under his real name of Olivier Raynaud. The series reached 206 titles in August 2012, with The Secret of the Winged Lions marking the end of the saga.

The French authors since December 2007 have been Arnaud Dalrune, Patrick Eris, then Nemo Sandman from 2010. The series has also attracted on recognized authors like Nadine Monfils (author of Commissioner Léon) for Blade #174 The Curse of Shadows 4 in 2007.

The cover illustrations for the French edition were from Loris Kalafat until his death in 2007; since Blade #180 The Country on the Other Side of the War, the illustrations were by Nemo Sandman who was also the author of Blade #195 - The Empire of Tesla and Blade #196 - The Shadow of the Horde, before continuing jointly with Patrick Eris from Blade #198 - Operation Resilience pn.

The Country on the Other Side of the War, the illustrations are signed by Nemo Sandman who signed as author Blade #195 The Empire of Tesla and Blade #196 The Shadow of the Horde before continuing jointly with Patrick Eris from Blade #198 Operation Resilience

Here is the complete list of "Jeffrey Lord" from 1970 to 2010:

 Manning Lee Stokes
 Roland Green
 Lyle Kenyon Engel
 Ray Faraday Nelson
 Richard D. Nolane
 Christian Mantey
 Arnaud Dalrune
 Yves Cheraqui
 Gerald Moreau
 Paul Couturiau
 Olga Tormes
 Amelina Defontaine
 Didier Le Gais
 Yves Bulteau
 Raymond Audemard
 Nadine Monfils
 Frederic Szczepaniak
 Patrick Eris
 Nemo Sandman

The series experienced upheavals in 2007: first the death of Loris Kalafat, its early illustrator, to whom tribute was paid in episode no. 179.  His replacement by Nemo Sandman, director of music videos and made it possible to modernize the visuals while keeping the Blade "leg". Similarly, after years of good and loyal service, the author Yves Chéraqui withdrew and Patrick Eris, author of more than ten novels, came to complete the team from No.  179 with Arnaud Dalrune . Latest news in 2010, Arnaud gives way to Nemo who becomes an illustrator and author. He forms with Patrick Eris a duo dedicated to offering quality popular literature (in the noble sense of the term).

All the cover illustrations for the French edition were signed by Loris Kalafat until his death in 2007; since Blade #180 The Country on the Other Side of the War, the illustrations are signed by Nemo Sandman who signed as author Blade #195 The Empire of Tesla and Blade #196 The Shadow of the Horde before continuing jointly with Patrick Eris from Blade #198 Operation Resilience.

References

American novel series
Novel series by featured character
Novels about parallel universes
Pinnacle Books books
Pulp fiction
Science fiction book series
Works published under a pseudonym